= OP Mahendra =

Indian politician

Member of the Rajasthan Legislative Assembly
- In office 2003–2008
- Constituency: Kesrisinghpur, Rajasthan

Personal details
- Party: Bharatiya Janata Party
- Education: BA, LLB
- Occupation: Politician

OP Mahendra is an Indian politician who served as member of the Rajasthan Legislative Assembly from Kesrisinghpur from 2003 to 2008. He is a member of the Bharatiya Janata Party.
